Ingmar is a Scandinavian given name and is a composite of Ing, possibly a Norse god, and Mar, meaning "famous". The name element Ing is also found in Ingvar, Ingolf, Ingeborg, and other names. Its name day is June 3. See also Ingemar.

Ingmar may refer to:
 Ingmar Berga, Dutch speed skater
 Ingmar Bergman, Swedish film director
 Ingmar De Poortere, Belgian cyclist
 Ingmar De Vos, Belgian sports manager
 Ingmar Elfsborg, American Spoon Collector
Ingmar Koch, German musician
 Ingmar Lazar, French pianist
 Ingmar Ljones, Norwegian politician
 Ingmar Ott, Estonian botanist
 Ingmar Vos, Dutch athlete
 Ingmar Zahorsky, German journalist

Swedish masculine given names
Scandinavian masculine given names
Estonian masculine given names
Norwegian masculine given names